G. carbonaria  may refer to:
 Geochelone carbonaria, the red-footed tortoise, a reptile species native to South America
 Geopyxis carbonaria, the charcoal loving elf-cup, a fungus species

See also
 Carbonaria (disambiguation)